2G is  the second-generation wireless telephone technology.

2G or 2-G may also refer to:
 Red 2G, a dye
 Yellow 2G, a dye
 Cargoitalia's IATA code
 A character from Eden of the East
 2G-Regel, a public health rule in use during the COVID-19 pandemic in Germany, Switzerland and Austria

See also
 2G+2, an album by the Fall
 The 2 G's, a radioshow
 G2 (disambiguation)
 GG (disambiguation)
 iPhone 2G